The Riding Tornado is a 1932 American Pre-Code Western film directed by D. Ross Lederman.

Cast
 Tim McCoy as Tim Torrant
 Shirley Grey as Patsy Olcott
 Montagu Love as Walt Corson
 Wheeler Oakman as Hatch Engall
 Wallace MacDonald as Dick Stark (Olcott's foreman)
 Russell Simpson as Sheriff
 Vernon Dent as Bartender Hefty
 Lafe McKee as Hiram Olcott

References

External links
 

1932 films
1932 Western (genre) films
American Western (genre) films
1930s English-language films
American black-and-white films
Films directed by D. Ross Lederman
Columbia Pictures films
1930s American films